Nguyễn Hữu Anh Tài (born 28 February 1996) is a Vietnamese footballer who plays as a defender for V.League 2 club Công An Nhân Dân.

In January 2017 Hữu Anh Tài completed a loan move to FC Uijeongbu, a Korean semiprofessional team playing in the K3 League or Third division.

Honours
Công An Nhân Dân
V.League 2: 2022

References 

1996 births
Living people
Vietnamese footballers
Association football defenders
People from Huế
V.League 1 players
Hoang Anh Gia Lai FC players
Vietnamese expatriate footballers
Vietnamese expatriate sportspeople in South Korea
Expatriate footballers in South Korea